No. 7 Wing (SAAF) was a South African Airforce fighter-bomber air wing during World War II.  The Wing served in the Western Desert and Italian campaigns. By the end of the North African campaign in May 1943, SAAF No 7 Wing, comprising 2, 4 & 5 Squadrons, was considered the best dive bomber formation in the world.

Organisation and squadrons
7 Wing was initially a RAF Wing.  In December 1942, 2, 4 and 5 Squadrons SAAF were placed in reserve and on 6 December 1942 they were assigned to 7 Wing SAAF under command of Lt.Col. D.H. Loftus.  It was the first time South African squadrons had operated together as a unified wing.    The wing badge was a leaping hartebeest on a red shield and was painted on the rudder of wing aircraft.  In 1943 and 1944, the wing supported partisan operations in Yugoslavia.  By Christmas 1944, the Wing was based at Forli near Bologna where it remained until the end of the war.
It comprised the below squadrons during its existence:

Citations

References
  Archived at HathiTrust Digital Library. }}
 
 
 

Wings of the South African Air Force
Air force units and formations of South Africa
Military units and formations established in 1941
Military units and formations disestablished in 1945